|}

This is a list of electoral division results for the Northern Territory 1977 General Election in Australia.

Results by electoral division

Alice Springs 

 Preferences were not distributed.

Arnhem 

 Preferences were not distributed.

Barkly 

 The number of votes each independent candidate received is unknown.

Casuarina

Elsey 

 The number of votes each individual Independent received is unknown.
 The independent candidate that came second on preferences is unknown.

Fannie Bay

Gillen

Jingili

Ludmilla

MacDonnell 

 Preferences were not distributed.

Millner 

 Preferences were not distributed.

Nhulunbuy 

 Preferences were not distributed.

Nightcliff 

 Preferences were not distributed.

Port Darwin

Sanderson 

 The number of votes each individual Independent received is unknown.

Stuart 

 Preferences were not distributed.

Stuart Park

Tiwi 

 The number of votes each individual Independent, Labor and CLP candidate received is unknown.
 The Labor candidate that came second on preferences is unknown.

Victoria River 

 Preferences were not distributed.

See also 

 1977 Northern Territory general election
 Members of the Northern Territory Legislative Assembly, 1977–1980

References 

Results of Northern Territory elections